Manuel Alday Marticorena (5 September 1917 – 28 December 1976), was a Spanish footballer who played for Real Madrid.

References

External links
 

1917 births
Spanish footballers
La Liga players
Real Madrid CF players
1976 deaths
Association football forwards
Footballers from San Sebastián